The following outline is provided as an overview of and topical guide to Vienna:

Vienna – capital of Austria and one of its nine states. It is the country's largest city, with over 1.8 million residents within an area of 414.65 km2 (160.10 sq mi). Vienna has a rich heritage and is considered one of the most livable cities in the world. It is the cultural center of Austria and a popular tourist destination, attracting over 6.8 million visitors per year. Having become the home of many musical luminaries throughout music's classical period (and later), including Mozart and Beethoven, Vienna is known as the City of Music.

General reference 
 Common English name(s): Vienna
 Official English name(s): Vienna
 Adjectival(s): Viennese, Wiener
 Demonym(s): Viennese, Wiener

Geography of Vienna 

Geography of Vienna
 Vienna is:
 a city
 capital of Austria
 a primate city of Austria
 a federated state
 a state of Austria
 Population of Vienna: 1,867,960
 Area of Vienna: 414.65 km2 (160.10 sq mi) 
 Atlas of Vienna

Location of Vienna 

 Vienna is situated within the following regions:
 Northern Hemisphere and Eastern Hemisphere
 Eurasia
 Europe (outline)
 Central Europe
 Austria (outline)
 Pannonian Basin
 Time zone(s):
 Central European Time (UTC+01)
 In Summer (DST): Central European Summer Time (UTC+02)

Environment of Vienna 

 Climate of Vienna

Natural geographic features of Vienna 

 Floodplains in Vienna
 Lobau
 Highlands in Vienna
 Vienna Woods
 Hills in Vienna
 Gallitzinberg
 Hackenberg
 Hermannskogel
 Hohe Warte
 Kahlenberg
 Leopoldsberg
 Schenkenberg
 Islands in Vienna
Donauinsel
 Rivers in Vienna
 Danube
Vienna Danube regulation
Donaukanal
New Danube
 Wien (river)

Areas of Vienna 

 Districts of Vienna

Locations in Vienna 

 Tourist attractions in Vienna
 Museumsquartier
 Shopping areas and markets
 World Heritage Sites in Vienna
Innere Stadt
Schönbrunn Palace

Bridges in Vienna 

 Hohe Brücke
 Northern Railway Bridge
 Reichsbrücke

City walls of Vienna 

 Linienwall

Cultural and exhibition centres in Vienna 

 Kunsthalle Wien
 Vienna Künstlerhaus

Monuments and memorials in Vienna 

 Pestsäule
 Rathausmann
 Scholars Pavilion
 Soviet War Memorial
 Spinnerin am Kreuz

Museums and galleries in Vienna 

Museums in Vienna
 Albertina
 Austrian Museum of Folk Life and Folk Art
 Ephesos Museum
 Funeral Museum Vienna
 Galerie nächst St. Stephan
 Globe Museum
 Haus der Musik
 Imperial Furniture Collection
 Imperial Treasury
Austrian Crown Jewels
 KunstHausWien
 Kunsthistorisches Museum
 Leopold Museum
 Liechtenstein Museum
 Madame Tussauds Vienna
 Mozarthaus Vienna
 mumok
 Museum of Applied Arts
 Museum of Military History
 Natural History Museum
 Österreichische Galerie Belvedere
 Technisches Museum Wien
 Vienna Museum

Palaces and villas in Vienna 

 Belvedere
Belvedere Palace Chapel
 Deutschmeister-Palais
 Episcopal Palace
 Hermesvilla
 Hofburg
Spanish Riding School
 Palais Arnstein
 Palais Auersperg
 Palais Augarten
 Palais Caprara-Geymüller
 Palais Chotek
 Palais Clam-Gallas
 Palais Coburg
 Palais Equitable
Stock im Eisen
 Palais Hoyos
 Palais Kinsky
 Palais Lieben-Auspitz
 Palais Lobkowitz
 Palais Modena
 Palais Mollard-Clary
 Palais Pallavicini
 Palais Porcia
 Palais Rasumofsky
 Palais Schey von Koromla
 Palais Schwarzenberg
 Palais Strozzi
 Palais Todesco
 Palais Trautson
 Schloss Hetzendorf
 Schloss Neugebäude
 Schloss Neuwaldegg
 Schloss Wilhelminenberg
 Schönbrunn Palace
Gloriette
Palmenhaus Schönbrunn
Wüstenhaus Schönbrunn
 Stadtpalais Liechtenstein
 Winter Palace of Prince Eugene

Parks and gardens in Vienna 

 Augarten
 Botanical Garden of the University of Vienna
 Danube-Auen National Park
 Prater
Wurstelprater
Wiener Riesenrad
 Rathauspark
 Stadtpark
 Volksgarten

Public squares in Vienna 

 Ballhausplatz
 Freyung
 Friedrich-Schmidt-Platz
 Heldenplatz
 Josefsplatz
 Karlsplatz
 Maria-Theresien-Platz
 Mexikoplatz
 Minoritenplatz
 Praterstern
 Rathausplatz
 Schillerplatz
 Schwarzenbergplatz
 Schwedenplatz
 Stephansplatz

Religious buildings in Vienna 

 Augustinian Church
 Capuchin Church
Imperial Crypt
 Dominican Church
 Franciscan Church
 Holy Trinity Greek Orthodox Church
 Jesuit Church
 Kaasgrabenkirche
 Karlskirche
 Lutheran City Church
 Maltese Church
 Minoritenkirche
 Piarist Church
 Schottenkirche
 Servite Church
 St. Canisius's Church
 St. Francis of Assisi Church
 St. Leopold's Church
 St. Michael's Church
 St. Peter's Church
 St. Rochus
 St. Stephen's Cathedral
 St. Ulrich
 Votive Church
 Wotruba Church

Secular buildings in Vienna 

 Arsenal
 Austrian Parliament Building
 Central Bathhouse Vienna
 DC Towers
 Dorotheum
 Gasometer
 Haas House
 Hundertwasserhaus
 Karl Marx-Hof
 Kursalon Hübner
 Lusthaus
 Messe Wien
 Millennium Tower
 Palace of Justice
 Palais des Beaux Arts
 Rathaus
Wienbibliothek im Rathaus
 Vienna International Centre
 Vienna Twin Tower
 Zacherlfabrik
 Zacherlhaus

Streets in Vienna 

 The Graben
 Herrengasse
 Kärntner Straße
 Vienna Beltway
 Wienzeile

Theatres in Vienna 

 Burgtheater
 Raimund Theater
 Theater am Kärntnertor
 Theater an der Wien
 Theater in der Josefstadt
 Vienna's English Theatre
 Volkstheater

Towers in Vienna 

 Donauturm

Demographics of Vienna 

Demographics of Vienna

Government and politics of Vienna 

Politics of Vienna
 Government of Vienna
 Gemeinderat and Landtag of Vienna
 Mayor of Vienna

Law and order in Vienna 

 Federal Police

International relations of Vienna 

 United Nations Office at Vienna
 United Nations Office on Drugs and Crime

History of Vienna 

History of Vienna

History of Vienna, by period or event 

Timeline of Vienna

 Beginnings and early Middle Ages (from the 1st through the 10th century)
 Babenberg rule (976)
 Habsburg rule (1278)
Turkish sieges
Siege of Vienna (1529)
Battle of Vienna (1683)
 Vienna during the 18th century
Plague epidemic (1713)
 Vienna during the 19th century
 Napoleonic Wars
 Vienna becomes capital of the Austrian Empire (1804)
 Congress of Vienna (1814–15)
 Expansion under Emperor Franz Joseph I
 Vienna during the 20th century
 World War I (1914–1918)
 The First Republic – Vienna becomes capital of the Republic of German-Austria (1918) and then of the First Austrian Republic in 1919
 Vienna during the Austrian Civil War of 1934
 Annexation by German Third Reich (1938)
 World War II (1939–1945)
 Vienna Offensive (1945)
 The Second Republic
 Modern history since independence (1955–present)

History of Vienna, by subject 
 History of the Czechs in Vienna
 History of the Hungarians in Vienna
 History of the Jews in Vienna

 Treaty of Vienna (1606)
 Treaty of Vienna (1656)
 Treaty of Vienna (1657)
 Treaty of Vienna (1725)
 Treaty of Vienna (1731)
 Treaty of Vienna (1738)
 Treaty of Vienna (1864)
 Treaty of Vienna (1866)

Culture of Vienna 

Culture of Vienna

Arts in Vienna 
 Wiener Moderne

Architecture of Vienna 
Architecture of Vienna
 Art Nouveau architecture in Vienna
Kirche am Steinhof
Secession Building
 Baroque architecture in Vienna
 Karlskirche
 Expressionist architecture in Vienna
Hundertwasserhaus
 Gothic Revival architecture in Vienna
 Rathaus
 Modern architecture in Vienna
 DC Towers
 Millennium Tower 
 Neoclassical architecture in Vienna
 Austrian Parliament Building
 Neo-Renaissance architecture in Vienna
 Kursalon Hübner
 Postmodern architecture in Vienna
Haas House
 Romanesque architecture in Vienna
St. Rupert's Church

Cinema of Vienna 

 Vienna International Film Festival
 Films set in Vienna

Literature of Vienna 
 Young Vienna
 Wiener Gruppe

Music of Vienna 

Music of Vienna
 Composers and musicians of Vienna
 First Viennese School – refers to Vienna's greats from the classical period of music
 Haydn
 Mozart
 Beethoven
 Franz Schubert
 Second Viennese School – Arnold Schoenberg and his students
 Arnold Schoenberg
 Third Viennese School
 Music genres originating in Vienna
 Schrammelmusik
 Viennese Waltz
 Wienerlied
 Music venues in Vienna
 Arena
 Konzerthaus
 Musikverein
Gesellschaft der Musikfreunde
 Vienna State Opera
Vienna State Ballet
 Vienna Volksoper
 Musical compositions set in Vienna
 Wiener Blut (waltz)
 The Blue Danube
 Musical ensembles in Vienna
 Concentus Musicus Wien
 Klangforum Wien
 Neue Oper Wien
 Orchester Wiener Akademie
 Tonkünstler Orchestra
 Vienna Boys' Choir
 Vienna Hofburg Orchestra
 Vienna Mozart Orchestra
 Vienna Philharmonic
Summer Night Concert Schönbrunn
Vienna New Year's Concert
Wiener Klangstil
 Vienna Radio Symphony Orchestra
 Vienna Symphony
 Wiener Singakademie
 Wiener Taschenoper

Theatre of Vienna 
Theatre of Vienna

Visual arts of Vienna 

 Academy of Fine Arts Vienna
 museum in progress
 Vienna School of Fantastic Realism
 Vienna Secession
 Viennese Actionism
 Wiener Werkstätte

Cuisine of Vienna 

Cuisine of Vienna

 Culinary specialities
 Popular dishes of Vienna

Events in Vienna 
Events in Vienna
 Donauinselfest
 Donaukanaltreiben Festival
 Grafenegg Festival
 ImPulsTanz Vienna International Dance Festival
 Jazz Fest Wien
 Vienna Biennale
 Vienna Festival
 Vienna International Film Festival
 Vienna Nightrow
 Vienna Spring Festival
 Wien Modern
 Wiener Internationale Gartenschau 74

Languages of Vienna 
Languages of Vienna
 Viennese German

Media in Vienna 
Media in Vienna
 Newspapers in Vienna
Der Standard
Die Presse
Wiener Zeitung
 Radio and television in Vienna
 ORF

People of Vienna 

People of Vienna
 List of honorary citizens of Vienna
 List of people from Vienna

Philosophy of Vienna 
Philosophy of Vienna
 Vienna Circle
Logical positivism

Religion in Vienna 

Religion in Vienna

 Catholicism in Vienna
Roman Catholic Archdiocese of Vienna
 Archbishop of Vienna
 St. Stephen's Cathedral
 Protestantism in Vienna
 Lutheran City Church 
 Buddhism in Vienna
 Peace Pagoda
 Islam in Vienna
 Vienna Islamic Centre

Sports in Vienna 

Sport in Vienna
 Basketball in Vienna
 BC Vienna
 Football in Vienna
 Austrian Football Bundesliga
 FK Austria Wien
 SK Rapid Wien
 Wiener Derby
 Rugby football in Vienna
 Vienna Celtic RFC 
 Ice hockey in Vienna
 Vienna Capitals
 Running in Vienna
 Vienna City Marathon
 Tennis in Vienna
 Vienna Open
 Sports venues in Vienna
 Albert Schultz Eishalle
 Allianz Stadion
 Ernst-Happel-Stadion
 Franz Horr Stadium
 Hohe Warte Stadium
 Trabrennbahn Krieau
 Vienna Watersports Arena
 Wiener Stadthalle

Economy and infrastructure of Vienna 

Economy of Vienna
 Congress and Convention location
Austria Center Vienna (ACV)
 Financial services in Vienna
Bank Austria
Vienna Insurance Group
Wiener Börse
 Hotels in Vienna
 Grand Hotel Wien
 Hotel Imperial
 Hotel Sacher
 InterContinental Vienna
 Schloss Wilhelminenberg
 Restaurants and cafés in Vienna
 Restaurants in Vienna
Griechenbeisl
Schweizerhaus
 Viennese coffee houses in Vienna
Café Central
Café Restaurant Residenz
Café Schwarzenberg
  Shopping malls and markets in Vienna
 Kärntner Straße
Steffl Department Store Vienna
 Naschmarkt
 Tourism in Vienna
 Tourist attractions in Vienna

Transportation in Vienna 

Transportation in Vienna
 Public transport in Vienna
 Public transport operators in Vienna
Wiener Linien
Wiener Lokalbahnen
 Air transport in Vienna
 Airports in Vienna
 Vienna International Airport
 Maritime transport in Vienna
 River ports and harbours in Vienna
 Harbours in Vienna
 Port of Vienna
 Shipping lines serving Vienna
 Twin City Liner
 Road transport in Vienna
 Bus transport in Vienna
 Car sharing in Vienna
 DriveNow
 Vienna Ring Road

Rail transport in Vienna 

Rail transport in Vienna
 City Airport Train
  Vienna S-Bahn
  Vienna U-Bahn
 List of Vienna U-Bahn stations
  Wiener Lokalbahn
 Railway stations in Vienna
 Wien Hauptbahnhof
 Wien Mitte railway station
 Wien Westbahnhof railway station
 Trams in Vienna

Education in Vienna 

Education in Vienna
 Universities in Vienna
 Medical University of Vienna
 Music and Arts University of the City of Vienna
 TU Wien
 University of Applied Arts Vienna
 University of Music and Performing Arts Vienna
 University of Vienna
Vienna Observatory
 Vienna University of Economics and Business
 Research institutes in Vienna
 Austrian Institute of Technology
 Erwin Schrödinger International Institute for Mathematical Physics
 Institute Vienna Circle
 Vienna Institute of Demography

Healthcare in Vienna 

Healthcare in Vienna
 Gesellschaft der Ärzte in Wien
 Hospitals in Vienna
 Steinhof
 Vienna General Hospital
 Wiener Privatklinik

See also 

 Outline of geography

References

External links 

 Vienna, in the Encyclopedia Britannica

 Official websites
Wien.gv.at – Official site of the municipality, with interactive map.
Wien.info – Official site of the tourism board: events, sightseeing, cultural information, etc.
List of Embassies in Vienna
Information about Vienna and Centrope countries
Geschichtewiki.wien.gv.at – Vienna History Wiki operated by the city of Vienna

 History of Vienna
Hundreds of articles on historical buildings of Vienna: Churches, Palaces, Art, Culture and History of Vienna
German flaktowers in Vienna
History of the Coat of Arms of Vienna and all (former) districts and municipalities
The free printing service for students in vienna

 Further information on Vienna
Vienna Information Sorted by categories. Choose from 5 Languages
Events in Vienna
Events and useful information from Vienna
WhenWhereWh.at

Vienna
Vienna
 1